Dame Annette Lesley Brooke, DBE (née Kelly; born 7 June 1947) is a British  Liberal Democrat politician.

She was the Member of Parliament (MP) for Mid Dorset and North Poole from the 2001 general election to 2015. At the time she left office, Brooke was the longest serving female MP in the history of the Liberal Democrats.

Early life
Brooke was educated at Romford County Technical School in Romford and the London School of Economics, graduating with a BSc degree in Economics. She qualified as a teacher at Hughes Hall, Cambridge. She was a tutor with the Open University for 19 years from 1971 and was a school teacher from 1974, including at Aylesbury, and then Head of Economics at the independent Talbot Heath School for Girls in Bournemouth, which she left in 1994.

Parliamentary career
Annette Brooke was elected as a councillor on Poole Borough Council in 1986; she was the council's deputy leader 1995–7 and 1998–2000, and the Liberal Democrat Group Leader 2000–1. She was the Mayor of Poole in 1998. She contested the Conservative-held seat of Mid Dorset and Poole North at the 2001 General Election.

At the previous election the Conservative Christopher Fraser won the seat by 681 votes. In 2001 Annette Brooke was elected by 384 votes and held the seat until 2015 where it was regained by the Conservatives. She made her maiden speech on 21 June 2001.

In Parliament she was made both a Liberal Democrat Whip and a Spokeswoman on Home Affairs by Charles Kennedy in 2001. In 2004 she became a spokeswoman on Children. Following the 2005 General Election (at which Annette Brooke held her seat with a much increased majority of 5,482), she became a spokeswoman on Education and Skills, and carried on in a similar position as spokeswoman on Children, Schools and Families.

In the 2010 General Election, Brooke's majority fell to 269 votes; a reduction of 5,213 votes. Her main challenger for the seat, Nick King (Conservative), secured a swing of 7.7% making her constituency one of the most marginal of the 2010 Election. Following the defeat of Sandra Gidley in the 2010 General Election, Brooke became the longest-serving female Liberal Democrat MP of the 55th parliament.

Brooke announced in 2013 that she would stand down as a Member of Parliament at the next general election in 2015.

Personal life and honours
In May 2005, she met Hollywood actress Natalie Portman to discuss the microfinance charity, FINCA International, and their joint plans to help the world's poorest people become self-sufficient. She is married to Michael (former geology schoolteacher, and councillor on Poole Borough Council since 2003) with two daughters, and is a partner in her family firm selling rocks and minerals, started in 1987. They live in Broadstone.

Brooke was appointed Officer of the Order of the British Empire (OBE) in the 2013 New Year Honours for public and political service. She was elevated to a Dame Commander of the Order of the British Empire (DBE) in the 2015 Dissolution Honours Lists on 27 August 2015. She was appointed to the Privy Council on 16 July 2014.

References

External links

 Annette Brooke MP official site
 Annette Brooke MP profile at the site of Liberal Democrats

 Profile: Annette Brooke at BBC News, 10 February 2005
 Broadstone Minerals owned jointly with her geologist husband

News articles
 Blandford Camp in November 2006
 The CSA in December 2004
 procedures in April 2003

1947 births
Living people
Academics of the Open University
Alumni of Hughes Hall, Cambridge
Alumni of the London School of Economics
Liberal Democrats (UK) councillors
Councillors in Dorset
Female members of the Parliament of the United Kingdom for English constituencies
Liberal Democrats (UK) MPs for English constituencies
Members of the Parliament of the United Kingdom for constituencies in Dorset
Members of the Privy Council of the United Kingdom
Officers of the Order of the British Empire
People from Broadstone, Dorset
Politics of Dorset
UK MPs 2001–2005
UK MPs 2005–2010
UK MPs 2010–2015
Dames Commander of the Order of the British Empire
21st-century British women politicians
21st-century English women
21st-century English people
Women councillors in England